The Adventist Church of Finland is a Protestant Christian religious community that began operating in Finland in 1892. In 2017, it had about 4,700 members, and more than 60 parishes.

Adventism arrived in Finland from the United States via Sweden in the early 1890s. Adventism initially gained a foothold among the Swedish-speaking population. The movement became an association in 1920, when the Finnish Seventh-day Adventist Philanthropists' Association was registered. Swedish-speaking Adventists formed their own organization in the late 1920s.

References 

Adventism by country
Organisations based in Finland
Protestantism in Finland